The Journal of Special Operations Medicine is the official journal of the Special Operations Medical Association. The journal provides peer-reviewed articles with a focus on unconventional and operational medicine, including tactical casualty care, and the practice of medicine in the remote and austere environment. It is considered a valuable resource bringing experts in various allied fields together.

History 
The journal was established in 2001 at the behest of the Command Surgeon's Office of the Special Operations Command US Military. Originally published by the United States Department of Defense, it passed to a private publisher in 2011.

The journal has a shared science program with the journal Wilderness & Environmental Medicine produced by the Wilderness Medical Society, resulting in shared article publications.

Abstracting and indexing
The journal is abstracted and indexed in Index Medicus/MEDLINE/PubMed, Scopus and Embase.

References

External links

Military medicine
General medical journals
Publications established in 2001